JS Asahi (DD-119) is the lead ship of the Asahi-class destroyer of the Japanese Maritime Self-Defense Force. Her namesake came from “Morning sun”.

Development 
The procurement of the destroyer began in 2013 in response to the reduction in the number of destroyers (namely the ) within the JMSDF. The two major characteristics of this destroyer is its bigger emphasis on anti-submarine warfare and the adoption of the COGLAG (combined gas turbine electric and gas turbine) propulsion system. A second destroyer was procured a year later.

Construction and career
She was laid down on 4 August 2015 and launched on 19 October 2016. Commissioned on 7 March 2018 with the hull number DD-119.

On 21 May 2022, the Asahi, the JS Makinami (DD-112), and the replenishment oiler, JS Hamana (AOE-424) sighted the PLAN Liaoning carrier strike group going towards Miyako-jima.

Gallery

References

Ships of the Japan Maritime Self-Defense Force
Ships built by Mitsubishi Heavy Industries
2016 ships
Asahi-class destroyers